Mohamed Hédi Chérif (23 July 1932 – 23 January 2021) was a Tunisian historian and academic. He specialized in the modern and contemporary history of Tunisia.

Biography
After his studies at Sadiki College and the École pratique des hautes études, he earned an agrégation in history in Paris and a doctorate from the Sorbonne in 1979. He served as dean from 1987 to 1990.

A professor emeritus at Tunis University, he was a member of the Tunisian Council for Scientific and Technological Research, as well as a founding member of the Tunisian Academy of Sciences, Letters, and Arts. He worked several times as a visiting professor in Maghreb, Europe, and the Middle East.

Chérif was one of the founders of the  General Union of Higher Education and Scientific Research at the Tunisian General Labour Union and was a recruiter for Tunisian higher education. In 1987, he was appointed to the committee on awarding the literature and arts prize of the Tunisian Ministry of Culture. He was very well known for his research on the Husainid dynasty.

Mohamed Hédi Chérif died on 23 January 2021 at the age of 88.

Honours
Officier (1969), then Commander of the Order of the Tunisian Republic (1971)
Officier of the National Order of Merit of Tunisia (1992)
Knight of the National Order for work (Tunisia)

Publications
(1980) تاريخ تونس : من عصور ما قبل التاريخ إلى الإستقلال
Pouvoir et société dans la Tunisie de H'usayn Bin Ali (1705-1740) (1984)
Histoire générale de l'Afrique, t. VI : L'Afrique au XIXe jusque vers les années 1880 (1996)
Histoire générale de l'Afrique, t. V : L'Afrique du XVIe au XVIIIe siècle (1999)
Individu et pouvoir dans les pays islamo-méditerranéens (2009)

References

1932 births
2021 deaths
20th-century Tunisian historians
Academic staff of Tunis University
French National Centre for Scientific Research scientists
Members of the Tunisian Academy of Sciences, Letters, and Arts
21st-century Tunisian historians